50000 series may refer to:

Japanese train types
 Kintetsu 50000 series electric multiple unit
 Nankai 50000 series electric multiple unit
 Odakyu 50000 series VSE electric multiple unit
 Tobu 50000 series electric multiple unit